Kenneth J Cooper (born 1943), is a male former boxer who competed for England. He fought as Ken Cooper.

Boxing career
He was a member of the Kyrle Hall ABC, in Birmingham and was the 1967 featherweight ABA champion, which was regarded as the UK National Championships at the time. The success included a win over Ken Buchanan. He had finished runner-up the previous year in 1966.

He represented England in tournaments with the highlight being selection for the Commonwealth Games. He represented England and won a silver medal in the 57 kg featherweight, at the 1966 British Empire and Commonwealth Games in Kingston, Jamaica.

He made his professional debut on 14 November 1967. and fought in 17 fights until 1970.

References

1943 births
English male boxers
Boxers at the 1966 British Empire and Commonwealth Games
Living people
Featherweight boxers
Commonwealth Games competitors for England